Benoit Marie (born December 26, 1992) is a Seychellois football player. He is a defender playing for the Seychelles national football team and has represented Seychelles in the AFCON 2018.

References 

Living people
1992 births
Seychellois footballers
Association football defenders
Seychelles international footballers